The One and Only... is a British entertainment show, celebrating some of Britain's best loved stars from the world of entertainment. The first show aired on 8 April 2012 and was presented by Des O'Connor. The second aired on 16 October 2013, which was presented by Paul O'Grady, starred the comedian's good friend, Cilla Black.

This series format could be considered a successor to ITV's long running similar series "An Audience With...", also featuring guest celebrity appearances.

Episodes
Episode viewing figures from BARB. Viewing figures do not include numbers from ITV HD or ITV +1.

Des O'Connor

The One and Only Des O'Connor was aired on 8 April 2012 to celebrate O'Connor's 80th Birthday. The show was presented by O'Connor and featured guests including Melanie Sykes, Bradley Walsh, Michelle Keegan, Katherine Kelly, Matt Lucas, Paul O'Grady and Robert Lindsay. O'Connor died on 14 November 2020, aged 88.

Cilla Black

The One and Only Cilla Black aired on 16 October 2013 and was hosted by Paul O'Grady. There were a number of guests who appeared in the episode including Christopher Biggins, Amanda Holden, Ringo Starr, Alison Moyet and Katie Melua.

Following Black's death on 1 August 2015, this episode was repeated on ITV on 4 August 2015. However, this was a specially adapted version of the episode and featured a tribute to Black from O'Grady.

References

2012 British television series debuts
2013 British television series endings
ITV (TV network) original programming
Television series by ITV Studios
English-language television shows